Jennifer Pepperman is an American television soap opera director and producer.

A veteran of several shows, Pepperman was executive producer of the short-lived Prospect Park online reboot of One Life to Live.

Positions held
As the World Turns
 Director (August 2004- September 2010)
 Occasional Director (2004)
 Associate Director (2000- August 2004)

Guiding Light
 Production Coordinator (Mid-1990s)

One Life to Live
 Executive Producer (April 2013–August 2013)
 Director (May 2011- January 2012)
 Associate Director (2010)
 Coordinating Producer (1998-2000)

Awards and nominations
Daytime Emmy Award
Win, 2007, Directing Team, As the World Turns
Nomination, 2001-2003, Directing Team, As the World Turns
Nomination, 2000, Directing Team, One Life to Live

References

External links

Soap opera producers
American television directors
American television producers
American women television producers
1973 births
Living people
American women television directors
21st-century American women